Ainstable is a civil parish in the Eden District, Cumbria, England.  It contains 21 buildings that are recorded in the National Heritage List for England.  Of these, one is listed at Grade I, the highest of the three grades, two are at Grade II*, the middle grade, and the others are at Grade II, the lowest grade.  The parish contains the villages of Ainstable, Croglin and Newbiggin, the hamlets of Dale, Walmersyke, Ruckcroft and Longdales, part of the village of Armathwaite, and the surrounding countryside.  The oldest listed building in the parish originated as a Benedictine Nunnery, and has been altered and since used for other purposes.  The other listed buildings consist of houses, farmhouses and associated structures, a bridge, a war memorial, a lych gate, and two churches.  


Key

Buildings

Notes and references

Notes

Citations

Sources

Lists of listed buildings in Cumbria